Thomas William Hogarth (Kelso, 6 April 1901 – 26 January 1999) was a Scottish, later Australian, veterinarian, writer on dogs, dog judge, dog breeder, genetics enthusiast and veterinary surgeon. He was an author of several books published in the 1930s about the Bull Terrier and breeding of Bull Terriers.

Hogarth was born in Kelso on the borders of Scotland, on 6 April 1901. He attended Kelso High School and Giggleswick School. After the First World War he traveled to and worked in Canada.  He bred Bull Terriers in the early 1920s in Scotland using the kennel name Galalaw.

Hogarth traveled extensively in the late 1920s and early 1930s as a dog judge, especially in 1929, when he judged in South Africa, India, Ceylon, Burma, and Australia.

While in Perth, Western Australia, he made comments related to the public debate about the Alsatian question.

He also judged dogs in Argentina in the early 1930s. He attended Ontario Veterinary College, University of Toronto (now University of Guelph) in the 1930s, and he graduated in 1937. While he was studying he published four books relating to Bull Terriers in the 1930s, as well as one book on recollections of his dog judging travels, and possibly the only book of verse about Bull Terriers.

Hogarth settled in and practiced as a Veterinary Surgeon at Swanbourne Veterinary Hospital (now known as Swanbourne Veterinary Centre), in Perth, Western Australia 1940s to the 1960s.

The main customers were dog and cat owners, but he did have the opportunity to deal with the occasional circus animal from visiting circuses. He was involved with early stages of the Guide Dogs for the Blind, Dogs Refuge Home, Western Australian Veterinary Surgeons Board and was patron of the Fremantle Ladies Pipe Band.

In the 1970s and 1980s he was one of a group of West Australian book collectors who were well known on the antiquarian book sale and auction circuit in Perth. He built up a private library of 10,000 volumes.

On retirement he lived in Darlington, Western Australia. He occasionally judged at dog shows in his 70s. With his wife, he bred Old English Game fowl and kept a range of dogs - but never a bull terrier. He died in Perth, Western Australia on Australia Day, 26 January 1999. His wife, son and three grandchildren survived him.

1929 Dog judging and travel
These are correlated to some of the text - Travels of a Dog Judge.

 3 January	 Sangrur, Jind, India
 January	 Patiala, India
 25–26 January	 Calcutta, India
 30 January	 Rangoon, Burma
 8–9 February	 Chutter Manzil, Lucknow, India
 11–12 February Allahabad, India
 18–19 February Bombay, India
 25 February	 Patiala, India
 4 March	 Dehra Dun, India
 8 March	 Calcutta, India
 15 March	 Colombo, Ceylon
 27–28 March	 Perth, Western Australia
 April, South Australia
 26–27 April	 Sydney, New South Wales
 14–18 May	 Ipswich, Queensland
 3 June	 Newcastle, New South Wales
 7–8 June	 Melbourne, Victoria
 2–3 August	 Ceylon
 20–21 September Durban, South Africa
 October	 Buenos Aires, Argentina

Bibliography

 The Bull Terrier, Manchester: Our Dogs. 1931.  First Edition.
 The Coloured and Colour Breeding, Galashiels: A Walker & Son. 1932
 Chapter 'Colour Breeding in Bull Terriers' by Major T Grahame and Captain J.N. Ritchie.
 Chapter 'Colour Inheritance in Bull-terriers' by Dr F Fraser Darling
 Travels of a Dog Judge Round the World, Galashiels, A Walker & Son 1935
 A Bull Terrier Notebook, Galashiels, A Walker & Son 1936
 Bull-Terrier Doggerel, Galashiels: A Walker & Son. 1937
 The Bull Terrier, Manchester, Our Dogs. 1937. Second edition.
  American reprint of The Bull Terrier, First Edition was not done in consultation with either Dr Hogarth or his family.
 Articles in the 1920s and 1930s in 'Our Dogs' and other dog magazines and newspapers.

Notes

1901 births
1999 deaths
Writers from Perth, Western Australia
Scottish veterinarians
Australian veterinarians
Male veterinarians
People from Kelso, Scottish Borders
People educated at Giggleswick School
University of Toronto alumni
People educated at Kelso High School, Scotland
Australian book and manuscript collectors
British emigrants to Australia